Struggle: The Life and Lost Art of Szukalski is a 2018 documentary film directed by Irek Dobrowolski, written by Stephen Cooper and Irek Dobrowolski and starring Stanisław Szukalski, Glenn Bray and Robert Williams. The documentary is produced by Leonardo DiCaprio, and his father George DiCaprio. The film was released by Netflix on December 21, 2018.

Premise
The documentary tells the story of the Polish artist Stanisław Szukalski’s troubled life and complicated body of work. He created his own language, and is a self-taught sculptor, who once lost all his work in a Nazi bombing raid. It also focuses on his nationalism and anti-semitic tendencies in the lead-up to World War II, and his subsequent repentance during the second half of his life.

Reception 
The documentary was reviewed positively by Karen Han in The New York Times, who stated that it "manages to deliver" on the breadth and depth implied by the title. Han noted: "Still, for Bray, George DiCaprio and others who knew Szukalski in his final years, their struggle with his past is deeply personal. They effectively become subjects themselves, grappling with how he ought to be remembered. The viewer is left to decide."

Cast
 Stanisław Szukalski
 Glenn Bray
 Robert Williams
 Suzanne Williams
 Gabriel Bartalos
 Sandy Decker
 George DiCaprio
 Natalia Fabian
 Jose Ismael Fernandez
 Rebecca Forstadt
 Marek Hapon
 Adam Jones
 James Kagel
 Lechoslaw Lemanski
 Maciej Miezian

References

External links

 
 
 

2018 documentary films
2018 films
Documentary films about visual artists
Netflix original documentary films
Films about sculptors
2010s English-language films